Land's End, also known as Leigh House, is a historic plantation house located near Hertford, Perquimans County, North Carolina.   It was built about 1830, and is a two-story, five bay by four bay, Greek Revival style brick dwelling.  It has a gable roof and features front and rear full-height porticoes supported by unfluted Doric order columns.

The house was added to the National Register of Historic Places in 1974.

Gallery

References

External links

Historic American Buildings Survey in North Carolina
Plantation houses in North Carolina
Houses on the National Register of Historic Places in North Carolina
Greek Revival houses in North Carolina
Houses completed in 1830
Houses in Perquimans County, North Carolina
National Register of Historic Places in Perquimans County, North Carolina
1830 establishments in North Carolina